"World, Hold On (Children of the Sky)" is a song by French music producer and DJ Bob Sinclar, featuring Steve Edwards. It was released as the second single from Sinclar's Western Dream album, on 17 April 2006. Following its release, the song reached number one in Hungary and Romania, peaked at number nine on the UK Singles Chart, and became a top-10 hit in 10 other European countries, including Sinclar's native France, where it peaked at number two. On the US Billboard Dance Club Songs chart, the track reached number one in July 2006. An E-Smoove-produced remix of the song was nominated for a 2007 Grammy Award for "Best Remixed Recording, Non-Classical".

Music video

The music video includes the same boy (David Beaudoin) from Sinclar's "Love Generation" and "Rock This Party" music clips. In the video, the boy wakes up and notices on the news, that the Earth is going to be destroyed by a meteor. He decides to build a space ship of his own and takes his dog with him in the space ship. During the construction of the spaceship, toys came out from under the boy's bed, and start dancing, while Bob Sinclar appears in the video as a tiny person playing "World, Hold On (Children of the Sky)" using cookies as records. The boy takes no notice of either the toys or Bob Sinclar. The boy then launches the space ship and shoots through the Solar System. The Solar System looks exactly like the poster in the boy's room. All the planets are labeled with information including diameter and other facts. In outer space, he sees the meteor approaching the Earth. He fires hundreds of basketballs at the meteor, destroys it, and saves the earth. He then lands the spaceship in his room. Back on Earth, he gets a reward and media coverage, presenting him as a hero. While he is getting praise, his mother comes and kisses him on the cheek. This wakes him up and causes him to realize that it was all a dream.

Chart performance
"World, Hold On (Children of the Sky)" entered the UK Singles Chart at number nine, its peak, in July. The song was also a success for Bob Sinclar's career. It was a number-one hit in Italy and reached the top 10 in several other countries, including Belgium, Denmark, Ireland, Finland, the Netherlands, and the UK. It peaked within the top 20 in Australia, Austria, Germany, Norway, Spain, Sweden, and Switzerland. The song also became Bob Sinclar's first number-one single on the US Billboard Hot Dance Club Play chart.

Weekly charts

Year-end charts

Certifications

Release history

See also
 List of number-one dance singles of 2006 (U.S.)
 List of Romanian Top 100 number ones of the 2000s

References

2005 songs
2006 singles
Bob Sinclar songs
Number-one singles in Italy
Number-one singles in Poland
Number-one singles in Romania
Songs written by Bob Sinclar
Songs written by Steve Edwards (singer)
Yellow Productions singles